Frak or frack is a fictional version of "fuck" first used in the 1978 Battlestar Galactica television series. It continues to be used throughout different versions of the Battlestar Galactica franchise and, more generally, as a profanity in science fiction.

Etymology

"Frak" is a fictional censored version of "fuck" first used in the 1978 Battlestar Galactica series (with the spelling "frack"). In the "re-imagined" version, and subsequently in Caprica, it appears with greater frequency and with the revised spelling "frak", as the producers wanted to make it a four-letter word. It occurs as an expletive and in expressions such as "fraks things up good" and "frakking toasters".

References

External links

Frak at the Battlestar Wiki

Euphemisms
Battlestar Galactica
Science fiction culture
English profanity